Nukusa is a Palearctic moth genus in the family Autostichidae.

Species
 Nukusa cinerella (Rebel, 1941)
 Nukusa praeditella (Rebel, 1891)

References

External links
 Images representing  Nukusa at Consortium for the Barcode of Life

 
Symmocinae